Trent Sieg (born May 19, 1995) is an American football long snapper who is a free agent. He played college football for Colorado State.

Professional career

Baltimore Ravens
Sieg signed with Baltimore Ravens as an undrafted free agent, but was released before the start of the 2018 season.

Oakland / Las Vegas Raiders
Sieg was signed by the Oakland Raiders on September 12, 2018, to replace injured long snapper Andrew DePaola. He appeared in all 16 games in the Raiders' last season in Oakland. 

The team became the Las Vegas Raiders, and he re-signed with the team on March 27, 2020. He signed a three-year contract extension with the team on March 3, 2021.

On March 19,2023, Sieg was released by the Raiders.

References

External links
Colorado State bio

1995 births
Living people
People from Greeley, Colorado
Players of American football from Colorado
American football long snappers
Colorado State Rams football players
Baltimore Ravens players
Oakland Raiders players
Las Vegas Raiders players